Crying for Love (Danish: Dig og Mig) is a Danish feature film. Written and directed by Christian E. Christiansen in 2008. It is based on the short film At Night, which was nominated for an Oscar in 2008.

References

External links
 

2008 drama films
2008 films
2000s Danish-language films
Danish drama films
Films directed by Christian E. Christiansen
Films produced by Louise Vesth